William Silcock Gardiner (15 August 1929 – 5 January 2007) was a Scottish  footballer who played as a forward for Rangers, Leicester City, Reading and Sudbury Town.

Born in Larbert, Gardiner started career in reserve football in Scotland with Rangers but got little opportunity to play first-team football with the likes of Willie Paton, Billy Simpson and the veteran Willie Thornton all in contention, although he had a strong scoring record when he was selected. He moved to England and signed for Leicester City for £4,000 under manager Dave Halliday.

He was a prolific goalscorer. In three seasons he scored 48 league goals in 69 games and was the leading goalscorer in the Second Division in the 1955–56 season. He lost his starting place in 1957 and was then playing reserve team football. In 1958 he signed for Reading, his time there being hampered by two serious injuries. He finished his career with Sudbury Town and later found employment as telephone exchange operator for British Telecom.

References

2007 deaths
Rangers F.C. players
Association football forwards
Leicester City F.C. players
Reading F.C. players
1929 births
Sudbury Town F.C. players
People from Larbert
Footballers from Falkirk (council area)
Scottish Football League players
English Football League players
Scottish footballers
Scottish Junior Football Association players
Scotland junior international footballers